The New Army, often referred to as Kitchener's Army or, disparagingly, as Kitchener's Mob,
was an (initially) all-volunteer portion of the British Army formed in the United Kingdom from 1914 onwards following the outbreak of hostilities in the First World War in late July 1914. It originated on the recommendation of Herbert Kitchener, then the Secretary of State for War to obtain 500,000 volunteers for the Army. Kitchener's original intention was that these men would be formed into units that would be ready to be put into action in mid-1916, but circumstances dictated the use of these troops before then. The first use in a major action of Kitchener's Army units came at the Battle of Loos (September–October 1915).

Origins

Contrary to the popular belief that the war would be over by Christmas 1914, Kitchener predicted a long and brutal war. He believed that arrival in Europe of an overwhelming force of new, well-trained and well-led divisions would prove a decisive blow against the Central Powers. Kitchener fought off opposition to his plan, and attempts to weaken or water down its potential, including piece-meal dispersal of the New Army battalions into existing regular or Territorial Force divisions (the view of the Commander-in-Chief of the British Expeditionary Force (BEF), Field Marshal French). Kitchener declined to use the existing Territorial Force (set up by Lord Haldane and Douglas Haig as part of the Army reforms of the Edwardian period) as the basis for the New Army, as many of its members had volunteered for "Home Service" only, and because he was suspicious of the poor performance of French "territorials" in the Franco-Prussian War 1870–1871. In the early days of the war, the Territorial Force could not reinforce the regular army, as it lacked modern equipment, particularly artillery.  In addition, it took time to form First-Line units composed only of men who had volunteered for "General Service".

Those recruited into the New Army were used to form complete battalions under existing British Army regiments. These new battalions had titles of the form "xxth (Service) Battalion, <regiment name>". The first New Army divisions were first used in August 1915 at Suvla Bay during the Gallipoli Campaign and also the Battle of Loos on the Western Front in the autumn of 1915; they were sorely tested in the Battle of the Somme. The initial BEF—a single army of five regular divisions in August 1914, grew to two field armies comprising 16 divisions by the end of 1914 when the Territorials had been deployed, and to five armies totalling around 60 divisions in strength by the summer of 1916; approximately 2 million men, of whom around half were infantry (the rest were gun crews, supply and logistics men etc.).

Recruitment 

All five of the full army groups (meaning a group of divisions similar in size to an army, not a group of armies) were made up of volunteer recruits, which included the famous Pals' Battalions. Due to the huge numbers of men wishing to sign up, in places queues up to a mile long formed outside recruitment offices, there were many problems in equipping and providing shelter for the new recruits. Rapidly the Government added many new recruitment centres, which eased the admissions burden, and began a programme of temporary construction at the main training camps. Almost 2.5 million men volunteered for Kitchener's Army.

By the beginning of 1916, the queues were not so long anymore. Information about the true nature of the war had reached Great Britain, and enthusiasm for volunteering plunged. Great Britain had to resort to conscription under the Military Service Act 1916, like the other great powers involved in the war. (Conscription was also applied "in reverse", so that skilled workers and craftsmen who had volunteered early in the war could be drafted back into the munitions industry, where they were sorely needed.)

The first conscripts arrived in France in late 1916 to fill the gaps in the volunteer units, which had been greatly diminished during the Battle of the Somme. After the bloody battles of 1916 and 1917, many of the British Army facing the Ludendorff Offensive of 1918 were conscripts, many of whom were youths under 21 years of age, or in their late thirties or older. Many of the other soldiers were men of lower levels of fitness who had volunteered earlier in the war and had since been "combed out" of rear echelon jobs. Roughly half of those who served in the British Army throughout the war, including more than half of the five million men serving in the British Army in 1918, were conscripts.

Training 

The British Army traditionally recruited on a regimental basis, therefore a recruit accepted into the Army was first sent to his new regiment's depot, where he received his kit and was introduced to army discipline and training. Next he was sent to the main training camps to join his battalion. In practice, no regiment had the required stocks of equipment, or the manpower to train the flood of recruits; men trained wearing their own clothes and shoes. To mitigate this problem, the army issued old stored uniforms, including First Boer War–vintage red jackets. Some regiments bought their own uniform and boots with money paid from public collections. Many regiments were also issued with emergency blue uniforms, popularly known as Kitchener Blue.  Whilst this crisis went on, the soldiers wore regimental and unit badges or patches on their clothing. Many photographs from the era show uniformed soldiers drilling alongside civilian clothed soldiers, perhaps led by red-jacketed NCOs.

The Regiments also suffered from a lack of officers to train them.  The government called up all reserve-list officers and any British Indian Army officer who happened to be on leave in the UK during the period. Men who had been to a recognised public school and university graduates, many of whom had some prior military training in Officer Training Corps, were often granted direct commissions. Commanding officers were encouraged to promote promising leaders and later in the war it was common for officers ("temporary gentlemen") to have been promoted from the ranks to meet the demand, especially as casualty rates among junior infantry officers were extremely high. Many officers, both regular and temporary, were promoted to ranks and responsibilities far greater than they had ever realistically expected to hold.

The Army had difficulty supplying new units with enough weapons. No artillery pieces had been left in Britain to train new artillery brigades, and most battalions had to drill with obsolete rifles or wooden mockups.  By early 1915 the Government had overcome many of these problems.  Among its methods was pressing into use old ceremonial cannons and unfinished modern artillery pieces (they lacked targeting sights).  During 1915, it corrected such shortages.

Later developments
At the beginning of 1918, the shortage of manpower in the British Expeditionary Force in France became acute.  The Army ordered infantry divisions to be reduced from twelve infantry battalions to nine. The higher-numbered battalions (in effect the New Army units, and some Second-Line Territorial units) were to be disbanded rather than the lower-numbered Regular and First-Line Territorial battalions. (Since Kitchener's death in 1916, no other major figure opposed this fundamental change to the principles on which the New Army had been raised.) In some cases, New Army divisions had to disband about half of their units to make room for surplus battalions transferred from Regular or First-Line Territorial divisions. While the change reduced the unique sense of identity of some New Army formations, it developed the divisions in France into more homogeneous units. By this time there was no longer much real distinction between Regular, Territorial, and New Army divisions.

Structure
Kitchener's New Army was made up of the following Army Groups (meaning a group of divisions similar in size to an army, not a group of armies) and Divisions:

K1 Army Group
 9th (Scottish) Division
 10th (Irish) Division
 11th (Northern) Division
 12th (Eastern) Division
 13th (Western) Division
 14th (Light) Division—originally 8th (Light) Division but renumbered when the regular army 8th Division was formed in September 1914.

K2 Army Group
 15th (Scottish) Division
 16th (Irish) Division
 17th (Northern) Division
 18th (Eastern) Division
 19th (Western) Division
 20th (Light) Division

K3 Army Group
 21st Division
 22nd Division
 23rd Division
 24th Division
 25th Division
 26th Division

Original K4 Army Group
Kitchener's Fourth New Army was formed from November 1914 with
 30th Division
 31st Division
 32nd Division
 33rd Division
 34th Division
 35th Division
The divisions were not fully formed when the decision was made to use them to provide replacements for the first three New Armies.  The divisions were broken up on 10 April 1915; the infantry brigades and battalions became reserve formations and the other divisional troops were transferred to the divisions of the newly created Fourth and Fifth New Armies.

K4/K5 Army Group
Redesignated K4 following breakup of original K4.
 30th Division—originally designated as 37th Division
 31st Division—originally designated as 38th Division
 32nd Division—originally designated as 39th Division
 33rd Division—originally designated as 40th Division
 34th Division—originally designated as 41st Division
 35th Division—originally designated as 42nd Division

K5 Army Group
Following the re-designation of the previous K5 Army Group, a new K5 Army Group was formed.
 36th (Ulster) Division—raised as the Ulster Division, numbered on 28 August 1914.
 37th Division—originally designated as 44th Division
 38th (Welsh) Division—originally designated as 43rd Division
 39th Division
 40th Division
 41st Division

Divisional structure in 1915
In 1915, the prescribed structure of a division would have comprised the following units:

 Divisional HQ
 Infantry:
 3 brigades, each comprising:
 4 battalions (with 4 machine guns each)
 Mounted troops:
 1 cavalry squadron
 1 cyclist company
 Artillery:
 HQ Divisional Artillery
 3 field artillery brigades (each of 4 batteries of four 18 pounders and one  ammunition column)
 1 field artillery howitzer brigade (of 4 batteries of four 4.5" howitzers and an ammunition column)
 1 heavy battery (four 60 pounders with an ammunition column)
 1 divisional ammunition column
 Engineers:
 HQ Divisional Engineers
 3 field companies
 Signals Service:
 1 signal company
 Pioneers:
 1 pioneer battalion (with 4 machine guns)
 3 field ambulances
 1 sanitary section
 1 mobile veterinary section
 1 motor ambulance workshop
 1 divisional train

Number of troops and equipment:
 All ranks: 19,614
 Horses & mules: 5,818
 Guns:
 48 × 18 pounders
 16 × 4.5" howitzers
 4 × 60 pounders
 Vickers machine guns: 52
 Assorted carts & vehicles: 958
 Cycles: 538
 Motor vehicles:
 cycles: 19
 cars: 11
 lorries: 4
 ambulances: 21

Divisional structure in 1918

In 1918, a typical division would have comprised the following units:

 Divisional HQ
 Infantry
 3 brigades, 
 each comprising 3 battalions, with 36 Lewis Guns (light machine guns) each
 and one light trench mortar battery with eight 3" Stokes
 Artillery
 H.Q. Divisional Artillery
 2 field artillery brigades
 each comprising three batteries with six 18 pounders and one battery of six 4.5" howitzers
 2 medium trench mortar batteries with 6 × 2" mortars each
 1 divisional ammunition column
 Engineers
 H.Q. Divisional Engineers
 3 field companies
 Signals Service
 1 signal company
 Pioneers
 1 pioneer battalion, 12 Lewis Guns
 Battalion, Machine Gun Corps
 comprising 4 companies, with 16 Vickers machine guns each
 3 field ambulances
 1 sanitary section
 1 mobile veterinary section
 1 motor ambulance workshop
 1 divisional train

Number of troops and equipment:
 All ranks: 16,035
 Horses & mules: 3,838
 Guns: 48
 18 pounders: 36
 4.5" howitzers: 12
 trench mortars: 36
 Stokes: 24
 Medium: 12
 Machine guns: 400
 Vickers: 64
 Lewis: 336
 Assorted carts & vehicles: 870
 Cycles: 341
 Motor cycles: 44
 Motor cars: 11
 Motor lorries: 3
 Motor ambulances: 21

See also
 List of British divisions in World War I

Footnotes

References

Bibliography
 
 
 Beckett, Ian, Timothy Bowman, and Mark Connelly. The British Army and the First World War (Cambridge University Press, 2017)
 Carrington, Charles E. "Kitchener's Army: The Somme and After." The RUSI Journal 123#1 (1978): 15-20.
 Ginzburg, Carlo. "‘Your Country Needs You’: A Case Study in Political Iconography." History Workshop Journal . No. 52. 2001.
 Royle, Trevor. Kitchener Enigma: The Life and Death of Lord Kitchener of Khartoum, 1850-1916 (The History Press, 2016).
 Simkins, Peter. Kitchener’s Army: The Raising of the New Armies 1914 – 1916 (2007)

External links 
 E-book The First Hundred Thousand by John Hay Beith at Project Gutenberg
 E-book All in It: K(1) Carries On a Continuation of the First Hundred Thousand by John Hay Beith at Project Gutenberg
 E-book Kitchener's Mob: Adventures of an American in the British Army by James Norman Hall at Project Gutenberg

 
British Army in World War I
Military units and formations of the British Army in World War I
Military units and formations of the United Kingdom in World War I
United Kingdom in World War I